The Colby-Bates-Bowdoin Consortium (CBB) is an athletic conference and academic consortium between three private liberal arts colleges in the U.S. State of Maine. The group consists of Colby College in Waterville, Bates College in Lewiston, and Bowdoin College in Brunswick. In allusion to the Big Three of the Ivy League, Colby, Bates, and Bowdoin, are collectively known the "Maine Big Three", a play on words with the words "Maine" and "main". The school names are ordered by their geographical organization in Maine (north to south).

The colleges contest the C-B-B Trophy in three-way football games in the Fall of their respective academic years. As of the 2017-18 season, Bowdoin leads the conference in wins, with 19; Colby has 14 and Bates has won 13. Colby holds the record for the longest streak of consecutive wins (1988–1992). Bates holds the record for biggest shutout with a 51–0 game over Colby in 1985. There have been seven three-way-ties: 1965, 1979, 1993, 1995, 2009, 2011, and 2013. The three colleges also contest the Chase Regatta, an annual up-and-down river tourney. The inaugural winner was Bowdoin, but the series has since been dominated by Bates and Colby; Colby has won the regatta five times and the President's Cup nine times. Bates currently holds the most titles (14 out of 20 wins), the winning streak (2006–present), and the most President's Cups (9 cups).

The CBB Consortium often draws comparisons to the football games of the Big Three of the Ivy League, with Bowdoin often drawing the connection to Harvard, Bates to Princeton, and Colby to Yale. Just as Harvard, Yale, and Princeton are initialized as HYP, so too are Colby, Bates, and Bowdoin as "CBB".

History 

From its inception, Bates College served as an alternative to a more traditional and historically conservative Bowdoin College. There is a long tradition of rivalry and competitiveness between the two colleges, revolving around socioeconomic class, academic quality, and collegiate athletics. The two colleges have competed against each other athletically since the 1870s, and subsequently share one of the ten oldest NCAA Division III football rivalries, in the United States.

The Bates-Bowdoin Game is the most attended football game every academic year at both colleges. As of 2015, both college's presidents are named Clayton (Spencer and Rose), leading students to include them in chants against each other. Bowdoin developed a "football fight song" entitled, "Forward the White" in 1913. All football games between the two occurred on Bowdoin's Whittier Field, but with the development of Bates' Garcelon Field, both fields have been used to hold football games.

Colby remained isolated from neighboring Bates, and the Colby-Bates-Bowdoin Consortium because of its location in Waterville, and socio-economic and political differences. However, in the 1940s, Colby began competing with the two colleges and in the first game, had a three-way tie. In 1988, Bates president Reynolds began the Chase Regatta, which features the President's Cup, which is contested by Bates, Colby, and Bowdoin annually.

The CBB Games is a college football competition between the three colleges. Each team plays the others once, with the C-B-B Trophy awarded to the college that beats the other two. The CBB Games was created for the 1965 college football season. Previously, Bates and Bowdoin have competed since 1870s against the University of Maine in the Maine State Series or Maine State Championship. When the University of Maine moved to a higher division in 1965, Colby joined and the rivalry took its current name.

The Chase Regatta is an annual rowing race between the men's and women's heavyweight varsity and club rowing crews of the colleges. The colleges have competed in the regatta since August 3, 1988 but have competed annually since August 3, 1997, when Bates President Thomas Hedley Reynolds instated the President's Cup to be contested by all three of the CBB schools. The President's Cup is given to the team that has won the most overall heats and races, while the overall winner is determined by who won the most varsity and heavyweight competitions in the regatta.

C-B-B Games results 
Note: Source of wins and losses: games between 1966 and 1978, games between 1979 and 1998, and for all other games not specified in aforementioned years:   The highest scoring game was the 1987 Colby-Bates with a total of 74 points. The lowest scoring game was the 1967 Bowdoin-Colby game with a total of 7 points. The biggest shutout was Bates' 51–0 game against Colby in 1985. The longest consecutive streak of games won is Colby with 5 championships in a row (1988–1992). There have been 7 three-way-ties, 1 two-way tie, and 4 uses of overtime, (the 2006 Colby-Bates game required overtime to be issued four times for a winner to be determined).

Series Statistics

Chase Regatta results

In fiction and literature 
In 1999, all three colleges were prominently featured in The Sopranos. In the episode entitled, "College", Tony Soprano takes his daughter, Meadow on a trip to Maine to tour the Colby-Bates-Bowdoin Consortium. They first visit Bates in Lewiston; while walking past the college's chapel she states, "[Bates has] a 48-to-52 male-female ratio, which is great, strong liberal arts program and this cool Olin Arts Center for music." They then drive up to Colby and Bowdoin using Drew University in New Jersey as the two college's exteriors. On the drive from Bates to Colby, Tony Soprano reveals to his daughter that he is in the mafia, a major turning point in the series.

See also 
 List of college athletic programs in Maine

References

External links 
For further information on history of the Colby-Bates-Bowdoin Consortium: 
2009 Article from Bleacher Report
Colby College CBB
For further reading:
CBB Faculty Resource Sharing
Bowdoin College Football History
CBB Study Abroad
CBB Library Resources
Bowdoin Football Featured in Sporting News "50 States, 50 Rivalries"
For further information on the NESCAC, and individual collegiate scores:
NESCAC Football Historic Scores
History of Bowdoin Football
Bates Football Past Seasons

New England Small College Athletic Conference
College sports rivalries in the United States
Bates Bobcats
Colby Mules
Bowdoin Polar Bears
Bowdoin College